Marchand is a frequent surname in France, in Quebec, and in Louisiana. (French word for merchant). It is sometimes anglicized to "Merchant", "Marchant", or "Merchand", all with similar pronunciations to Marchand.

People
The surname may refer to:

A
 Albert Gallatin Marchand (1811–1848), Democratic member of the U.S. House of Representatives from Pennsylvania 
 André Marchand (painter) (1907–1997), French painter of the new Paris school
 André Marchand (politician) (1926–2011), politician of the Quebec Liberal Party
 Angel M. Marchand (1912–2005), Puerto Rican physician and researcher
 Anne-Marie Marchand (1927–2005), French costume designer

B
 Bertrand Marchand (born 1953), French soccer trainer
 Blaine Marchand (born 1949), Canadian writer
 Brad Marchand (born 1988), Canadian ice hockey player

C
 Charmaine Marchand-Stiaes, American politician. 
 Christophe Marchand (born 1972), French freestyle swimmer
 Clément Marchand (1912–2013), Canadian writer
 Colette Marchand (1925–2015), French dancer and actress
 Corinne Marchand (born 1931), French actress

D
 David Marchand (1776–1832), member of the U.S. House of Representatives from Pennsylvania

E
 Erik Marchand (born 1955), Breton musician

F
 Félix-Gabriel Marchand (1832–1900), Canadian journalist, author, and politician in Quebec
 Felix Jacob Marchand (1846–1928), German pathologist

G
 Gerald Marchand (1921–2005), British olympian in canoeing
 Gilles Marchand (born 1963), French film director
 Guy Marchand (born 1937), French actor and singer

H
 Hans Marchand (1907–1978), German linguist
 Henri Marchand, French-American sculptor
 Hugo Marchand, French ballet dancer

I
 Inga Marchand (born 1978), better known as Foxy Brown, an American rapper

J
 Jackie Marchand, television writer and producer
 Jean Marchand, (1918–1988), French Canadian trade unionist and politician
 Jean-Baptiste Marchand (1863–1934), French emissary in Africa
 Jean Gabriel Marchand (1765–1851), French general under Napoleon
 Jean Hippolyte Marchand, (1883–1941), French painter
 Jean-Paul Marchand (born 1944), former member of the Canadian House of Commons and a professor
 Joseph Marchand (1803–1835), one of the Vietnamese Martyrs
 Joséphine Marchand, (1861–1925) Canadian journalist and feminist

L
 Leon Marchand (born 2002), French World Champion & Olympic Swimmer
 Leonard Marchand (1933–2016), former Canadian politician
 Louis Marchand (1669–1732), French virtuoso organist and harpsichordist 
 Louis-Joseph Marchand (1692—1774), French music theorist, composer, choir director, and priest
 Louis-Joseph-Narcisse Marchand (1791–1876), Napoleon's first valet

M
 Max Marchand (1888–1957), Dutch chess master
 Meche Marchand or Rivka Marchand, Jewish actress and author

N
 Nancy Marchand (1928–2000), American actress
 Nestor Léon Marchand (1833–1911), French doctor and botanist
 Nick Marchand, Australian theatre director

P
 Philippe Marchand (1939–2018), French politician
 Pierre Marchand (editor) (1939–2002), French editor and publisher
 Pierre Marchand (fencer) (born 1948), French fencer
 Pierre Marchand (born 1958), Canadian musician and record producer

R
 Richard Felix Marchand (1813–1850), German chemist
 Robert Marchand (athlete) (1904–1983), French olympian in hurdling
 Robert Marchand (cyclist) (1911–2021), French cyclist
 Romany Marie Marchand (1885–1961), Greenwich Village restaurateur

S
 Sidney A. Marchand (1887–1972), American lawyer, politician and author
 Steve Marchand (born 1974), current mayor of Portsmouth, New Hampshire 
 Suzanne L. Marchand, (born 1961), American intellectual historian

T
 Theodore J. Marchand, American politician

X
 Xavier Marchand, (born 1973), former French medley swimmer

Y
 Yannick Marchand (footballer, born 1988), Belgian footballer
 Yannick Marchand (footballer, born 2000), Swiss footballer
 Yves Marchand, Swiss bobsledder
 Yves Marchand and Romain Meffre, French photographer duo

Places
 Marchand, Manitoba, Canada
 Marchand, Northern Cape, South Africa
 Marchand, Louisiana
 Marchand, Ohio
 Marchand, Pennsylvania
 Marchand, Quebec, a community in Rivière-Rouge

See also
 Jean Baptiste Louis DeCourtel Marchand (died 1722), French military commanding officer of Fort Toulouse now called Fort Jackson
 Marchand de cailloux, studio album from the French musician Renaud 
 Marchand Mission
 Marchant
 Merchant (surname)

French-language surnames
Occupational surnames

pt:Marchand